Adyghe (IPA:  or ;), also known as West Circassian, is a Northwest Caucasian language spoken by the western subgroups of Circassians. It is spoken mainly in Russia, as well as in Turkey, Jordan, Syria and Israel, where Circassians settled after the Circassian genocide (c. 1864–1870). It is closely related to the Kabardian (East Circassian) language, though some reject the distinction between the two languages in favor of both being dialects of a unitary Circassian language.

The literary standard of Adyghe is based on its Temirgoy dialect. Adyghe and Russian are the two official languages of the Republic of Adygea in the Russian Federation.

In Russia, there are around 128,000 speakers of Adyghe, almost all of them native speakers. In total, some 300,000 speak it worldwide. The largest Adyghe-speaking community is in Turkey, spoken by the diaspora from the Russian–Circassian War (–1864). In addition, the Adyghe language is spoken by the Cherkesogai in Krasnodar Krai.

Adyghe belongs to the family of Northwest Caucasian languages. Kabardian (also known as East Circassian) is a very close relative, treated by some as a dialect of Adyghe or of an overarching Circassian language. Ubykh, Abkhaz and Abaza are somewhat more distantly related to Adyghe.

Dialects

The Black Sea coast dialects 
Shapsug dialect
North Shapsugs, Great Shapsugs, Kuban Shapsugs (Шапсыгъэ шху) dialect
Kfar Kama dialect (Кфар Камэм ишапсыгъэбзэ)
Temirgoy-Shapsugs, Pseuşko accent (Кӏэмгуе-шапсыгъ)
South Shapsugs, Small Shapsugs, Coastal Shapsugs, Black Sea Shapsugs (Шапсыгъэ-цӏыкӏу) dialect
Hakuchi dialect (Хьакӏуцубзэ, Къарацхаибзэ)
Natukhai dialect
Zhaney dialect

The Kuban River dialects 
Bzhedug dialect: spoken by Circassians in the Republic of Adygea and the Biga district of the city of Çanakkale in Turkey
Temirgoy: literary standard of Adyghe. Also spoken by Circassians in the Republic of Adygea
Abzakh dialect: spoken by Circassians in the village of Rehaniya in Israel and Circassians in Syria from the Golan Heights
Mamkhegh dialect
Yegeruqay dialect
Hatuqwai dialect
Mequash dialect

Phonology 

Adyghe exhibits a large number of consonants: between 50 and 60 consonants are used across various Adyghe dialects. All dialects possess a contrast between plain and labialized glottal stops. A very unusual minimal contrast, and possibly unique to the Abzakh dialect of Adyghe, is a three-way contrast between plain, labialized and palatalized glottal stops (although a palatalized glottal stop is also found in Hausa and a labialized one in Tlingit). The Black Sea dialect of Adyghe contains a very uncommon sound: a bidental fricative , which corresponds to the voiceless velar fricative  found in other varieties of Adyghe.

 These consonants exist only in borrowed words.
 Note: Adyghe has many consonants that appear across its dialects, and thus has a complex system of consonant allophony. More information on those can be found at Adyghe phonology.

In contrast to its large inventory of consonants, Adyghe has only three phonemic vowels in a vertical vowel system.

Grammar 

Adyghe, like all Northwest Caucasian languages, has a basic agent–object–verb typology and is characterised by the ergative construction of sentences.

Orthography 
The official alphabet for Adyghe is the Cyrillic script, which has been used since 1936. Before that, the Arabic script was used. In recent years, a new Latin script has been devised that seeks to include phonemes from all the Adyghe and Kabardian dialects, as well as other North Caucasian languages.

 There are thirteen labialised consonants; however, in some dialects, there are three additional ones: Кхъу , Ху  and Чъу .‎
‎ 
‎

Orthography rules 
For example: унэ  "house" instead of уынэ.
For example: унэ instead of уынэ. For example: чэту  "cat" instead of чэтыу.
For example: гъогу  "road" instead of гъуэгу.
For example: цуакъэ  "shoes".
 In case the letter  is the first letter of a word or when it is not related to any other consonant, it is pronounced as [wɐ] . For example, о  "you" instead of уэ.
For example: еӏо  "he says" instead of йэӏо. For example: делэ  "fool" instead of дэйлэ.
For example: илъэс  "year" instead of йылъэс. For example: сиӏ  "I have" instead of сыйӏ.

Vowels 

Other writing systems 
The language of Adyghe is officially written in the Cyrillic script but is also unofficially written in the Latin script, in a version of the Arabic script before 1927, and then a version of the Latin alphabet implemented by the Soviet Union until 1938.

Examples of literary Adyghe

Native vocabulary

Loanwords

Adyghe outside Circassia 
Adyghe is taught outside Circassia in Prince Hamza Ibn Al-Hussein Secondary School, a school for Jordanian Adyghes in Jordan's capital city of Amman. This school, established by the Jordanian Adyghes with support from the late king Hussein of Jordan, is one of the first schools for the Adyghe communities outside Circassia. It has around 750 Jordanian Adyghe students, and aims to preserve the Adyghe language and traditions among future generations.

Adyghe is spoken by Circassians in Iraq and by Circassians in Israel, where it is taught in schools in their villages. It is also spoken by many Circassians in Syria, although the majority of Syrian Circassians speak Kabardian.

Publications 
There are many books written in or translated into Adyghe. An Adyghe translation of the Quran by Ishak Mashbash is available. The New Testament and many books of the Old Testament have been published in Adyghe by the Institute for Bible Translation in Moscow.

UNESCO 2009 map of endangered languages 
According to the UNESCO 2009 map entitled "UNESCO Map of the World's Languages in Danger", the status of the Adyghe language in 2009, along with all its dialects (Adyghe, Western Circassian tribes; and Kabard-Cherkess, Eastern Circassian tribes), is classified as vulnerable.

Sample text

See also 
Adyghe Maq, the main Adyghe-language newspaper

Notes

References

External links 

 Grammar of the Circassian Language. Useful site to learn the Adyghe grammar.
 
 Adyghe alphabet, Omniglot.
 .
 Adyghe sample, Language Museum.
 Learning Adyghe resource.
 Learn Circassian, International Centre for Circassian Studies (ICCS).
 Rferl North Caucasus Radio.
 Adyghe transliteration tool.
 Ancient Adyghe Abkhaz–Abaza Ubykh alphabet.
 How to count in Adyghe language.
 Adyghe language dictionary.
 Recordings of Adyghe language

 
Northwest Caucasian languages
Languages of Iraq
Languages of Jordan
Languages of Russia
Languages of Syria
Languages of Turkey
Agglutinative languages
Endangered Caucasian languages
Adygea
Krasnodar Krai
Vertical vowel systems
Languages written in Cyrillic script